Lena Rivers is a 1914 silent feature film based on Mary J. Holmes novel and produced and distributed by Cosmos Feature Film Corporation. It stars Beulah Poynter, who adapted the novel into a play in 1906 and starred in the play. The film was the first of two film of the same title released in 1914.

A print is preserved in UCLA Film and Television Archive.

Cast
Beulah Poynter - Helena Nichols, Lena Rivers
Lizzie Conway - Granny
Robert Tabor - Harry Graham
Charlie De Forest - Joel Scovendyke
Caroline Rankin - Nancy Scovendyke
Walter Armin - John Nichols
Marie Mason - Lucy Belmont
Winifred Burke - Caroline

References

External links
Lena Rivers at IMDb.com

lobby poster

1914 films
American silent feature films
Films based on American novels
Silent American drama films
1914 drama films
American black-and-white films
1910s American films